Berezna is an urban-type settlement in Chernihiv Raion, Chernihiv Oblast, Ukraine. It hosts the administration of Berezna settlement hromada, one of the hromadas of Ukraine. Population: 

Berezna is located on the banks of the Krasilovka River, a right tributary of the Desna.

Until 18 July 2020, Berezna belonged to Mena Raion. The raion was abolished in July 2020 as part of the administrative reform of Ukraine, which reduced the number of raions of Chernihiv Oblast to five. The area of Mena Raion was split between Chernihiv and Koriukivka Raions, with Berezna being transferred to Chernihiv Raion.

Economy

Transportation
Berezna is on Highway H27, connecting Chernihiv and Novhorod-Siverskyi. A road branches off north to Snovsk with further access to Koriukivka and Horodnia.

References

Chernigovsky Uyezd
Urban-type settlements in Chernihiv Raion